Marcos Paz is a partido in the Argentine province of Buenos Aires. Its capital city is Marcos Paz.

Established on 25 October 1878 (provincial law 1244), Marcos Paz is at the eastern border of Greater Buenos Aires with the rest of the province, although in an administrative sense, it is not considered part of the metropolitan area.

Marcos Paz's mayor is Ricardo Pedro Curuchet, of the local Partido Vecinalista.

Name
The town of Marcos Paz, which gives its name to the partido, gradually built up around a train station, Estación Coronel Doctor Marcos Paz. The station was named after Coronel Doctor Marcos Paz, an Argentine politician and vice president to Bartolomé Mitre in 1862.

Mayor
Ricardo Curutchet: Affiliated with the UCR, was mayor of Marcos Paz in 2003 with an alliance of parties called "Coalition for Marcos Paz". Government since then in coalition with other forces such as the UCR, the Frente Grande, Peronist sectors, the kichnerismo, Encuentro Popular, independent sectors and progressive neighborhood. Was reelected in 2007 and 2011, reinforcing the Coalition for Marcos paz as a political base of your project.

External links

 Marcos Paz at the Ministry of Interior's website
 Noticias de Marcos Paz

 
1878 establishments in Argentina
Partidos of Buenos Aires Province